Antodynerus is an Afrotropical and Indomalayan genus of potter wasps.

References

Potter wasps